Dići is a village situated in Ljig municipality in Serbia. The town is known for having a medieval church dedicated to St. John, and being the burial place of 14th-century nobleman Vlgdrag.

References

Populated places in Kolubara District